Gabriel Fowler Smith (February 13, 1876 – March 23, 1939) was a Canadian politician. He served in the Legislative Assembly of New Brunswick as member of the Liberal party from 1935 to 1939.

Gabriel Smith was born in Blissville, Sunbury County, New Brunswick, Canada. He married Gertrude Victoria Shanks and had 4 kids.

References

1876 births
1939 deaths
20th-century Canadian politicians
New Brunswick Liberal Association MLAs